Indus Hospital and Health Network (IHHN) is a non-profit organization comprising a nationwide healthcare network of primary, secondary, and tertiary healthcare facilities across Pakistan. IHHN offers healthcare services to all patients completely free of cost.

The Indus Hospital – Korangi Campus, was established in 2007 as a single 150-bed hospital located in Korangi, Karachi. When it started, it was Pakistan's first paperless and cashless hospital; the hospital has an e-cardiology system.

IHHN comprises 15 hospitals, four regional blood centres, four physical rehab centres, a Pediatic Oncology Centre reputed to be the largest in Pakistan, 36 Primary Care offerings, and conducts public health initiatives.

Indus Hospital and Health Network includes the Indus University of Health Sciences, the Indus Hospital Research Center, and a Postgraduate Medical Education Program in its ambit.it is accredited by the College of Physicians and Surgeons of Pakistan.

References

External links
Indus Hospital website, at http://www.indushospital.org.pk/ .

Hospital buildings completed in 2007
Hospitals in Karachi
Hospital networks in Pakistan
Organisations based in Karachi